The Muscarelle Museum of Art is a university museum affiliated with the College of William & Mary in Williamsburg, Virginia. While the Museum only dates to 1983, the university art collection has been in existence since its first gift – a portrait of the physicist Robert Boyle – in 1732. Most early gifts to William & Mary relate to its history or the history of the Commonwealth of Virginia. Gifts of portraiture were the foundation of the early collection and include many First Families of Virginia (FFV) including sitters from the Page, Bolling and Randolph families.

History 
Throughout the years, gifts of art continued to accumulate including a donation of White Flower by Georgia O'Keeffe given to William & Mary in 1938 by Abby Aldrich Rockefeller. This major work in the collection had indiscriminately "decorated" various campus walls, old and new, until it was re-discovered by President Thomas Ashley Graves Jr. in the 1970s. Graves tasked Dr. Miles Chappell, from the department of art and art history, to make a college-wide inventory. It was at that time that the immensity and importance of the growing collection was understood and the need for a university museum became apparent.

With the support of numerous alumni, including a major benefactor, Joseph L. Muscarelle (W&M '27) and his wife Margaret, the Muscarelle Museum of Art opened in 1983 with Dr. Glenn D. Lowry as director. In 1987, the second director, Mark Johnson oversaw the expansion of the facility and the first American Alliance of Museums accreditation in 1988. Subsequent accreditations came in 2000 under then-director Dr. Bonnie Kelm, and in 2012 under former director Dr. Aaron De Groft.  David M. Brashear was appointed as interim director in January 2019, and in June 2020 was named as the museum's fifth director.

Current activities 
Today the collection numbers over 6,000 works. Of particular note are Colonial American and English seventeenth and eighteenth century portraits; a survey collection of original prints and drawings from the fifteenth through the twenty-first centuries including Japanese prints and a major collection of German Expressionist works by Hans Grohs; and the Jean Outland Chrysler collection of American modern works interpreted in oils, drawings, watercolors, and sculpture. Recent acquisitions include European master works by such artists as Luca Giordano and Luca Forte, historic photographic works by Julia Margaret Cameron, Carleton E. Watkins and Edward S. Curtis, as well as contemporary Native American works by Kay WalkingStick, Jaune Quick-to-See Smith, Emmi Whitehorse, and Cara Romero.

Plans are underway to renovate and expand the existing museum to create a state of the art facility as part of the Martha Wren Briggs Center for the Visual Arts designed by world-renowned architects Pelli Clarke & Partners. The expanded Muscarelle Museum of Art will provide additional gallery space for both traveling exhibitions and the permanent collection as well as create additional space for lectures, events, and programming.

Selected exhibitions

References

External links

 

1983 establishments in Virginia
Art museums established in 1983
Art museums and galleries in Virginia
College of William & Mary buildings
Museums in Williamsburg, Virginia
University museums in Virginia